United Nations Security Council Resolution 162, adopted on April 11, 1961, after a complaint submitted by Jordan and noting a decision of the Israel-Jordan Mixed Armistice Commission, the Council endorsed that body's decision and urged Israel to comply with it.  The Council requested the member of the Commission to co-operate to ensure that the General Armistice Agreement between Israel and Jordan will be complied with. Representatives from Jordan and Israel were present at the meeting.

Resolution 162 was adopted by eight votes in favour, none against, and three abstentions from Ceylon, the Soviet Union and the United Arab Republic.

See also
List of United Nations Security Council Resolutions 101 to 200 (1953–1965)

References
Text of the Resolution at undocs.org

External links
 

 0162
 0162
Israeli–Palestinian conflict and the United Nations
 0162
1961 in Jordan
1961 in Israel
April 1961 events